The following lists events that happened during 2003 in Cape Verde.

Incumbents
President: Pedro Pires
Prime Minister: José Maria Neves

Events
February 24: Monte Gordo Natural Park on São Nicolau established
June 9: Instituto de Estudos Superiores Isidoro da Graça (IESIG) established in Mindelo
September 19: Cape Verdean maritime delimitation treaty with Mauritania signed
December 9: Roman Catholic Diocese of Mindelo established from the northern part of the Roman Catholic Diocese of Santiago de Cabo Verde

Arts and entertainment
September 23: Cesária Évora's 11th album Voz d'Amor was released

Sports
Académico do Aeroporto won the Cape Verdean Football Championship

References

 
Years of the 21st century in Cape Verde
2000s in Cape Verde
Cape Verde
Cape Verde